Kungälvs VBK is a volleyball club in Kungälv, Sweden, established in 1973. The club won the Swedish men's national championship in 1989, 1991, 1992 and 1993.

References

External links
Official website 

1973 establishments in Sweden
Sport in Västra Götaland County
Volleyball clubs established in 1973
Swedish volleyball clubs